The Saipan Channel is a narrow strait which separates the south coast of Saipan from the north coast of Tinian in the Northern Mariana Islands.

Geography of the Northern Mariana Islands